Lake Hughes is an unincorporated community in northern Los Angeles County, California. It is in the Sierra Pelona Mountains, northwest of Palmdale and north of the Santa Clarita Valley, in the Angeles National Forest. It is on the sag pond waters of Lake Hughes and Elizabeth Lake. The community is rural in character, with a population of 649 in 2010, but also has a strong recreational element centered on the three lakes in the vicinity. The community of Elizabeth Lake is located just east of Lake Hughes, sharing the same ZIP code.

History
Nearby Elizabeth Lake, known then as La Laguna de Chico Lopez, was a watering locale on Spanish colonial and Mexican El Camino Viejo in Alta California and the Gold Rush era Stockton – Los Angeles Road. From 1858 to 1861, Lake Hughes was on the route of the Butterfield Overland Mail, between the Widow Smith's Station and Mud Spring stage stops. The lake area was to the west of Rancho La Liebre, an 1846 Mexican land grant now part of Tejon Ranch.

Lake Hughes was named for Judge Griffith (Patrick) Hughes, who homesteaded the area around the turn of the 20th century. Settlers were drawn to the area because water was more plentiful than in the drier Antelope Valley.

In 1907 William Mulholland, superintendent of the Los Angeles Department of Water and Power, started work on the Elizabeth Lake Tunnel for transporting water in the Los Angeles Aqueduct from Owens Valley to Los Angeles. Less than a half a mile east of Lake Hughes, the five-mile-long (8 km) tunnel is  under the valley floor. The tunnel was driven from both ends. The north portal is at Fairmont Reservoir and the south in Bear Canyon (now Portal Canyon) just off of Green Valley. This 11-foot-wide (3.4 m) tunnel was driven  through solid rock and met in the center within 1½ inches (3.8 cm) in line and ⅝ inches (1.6 cm) in depth. The Elizabeth Lake Tunnel was the largest single construction project on the Los Angeles Aqueduct and set speed records in its day.

C.A. Austin promoted Lake Hughes as a summer resort in 1924, as a "fine mountain resort on the edge of Antelope Valley."

The 2020 Lake fire was also first reported here.

Geography
Lake Hughes is generally centered on the intersection of Elizabeth Lake Road and Lake Hughes Road, both of which are county highways. Hughes Lake and Munz Lakes are located within the community. In addition, a third lake, Lake Elizabeth is located just to the east within the community of Elizabeth Lake.  Lakes Hughes and Lake Elizabeth are in the canyons along the San Andreas Fault. Both lakes periodically dry up depending on rainfall cycles. Lake Hughes was previously known as West Elizabeth Lake.

Government and associations

The Los Angeles County Sheriff's Department (LASD) operates the Palmdale Station in Palmdale, serving Lake Hughes.

Lake Hughes has its own community town council, The Lakes Town Council, which meets twice a month at the Lakes Community Center. The council helps plan community events (such as the yearly 49ers day festival and parade), hosts socials and mixers, and works with Los Angeles County officials on community planning and community standards.

There are many clubs and associations within the Lake Hughes and Elizabeth Lake area. The most prominent is the Ranch Club, the town's country club and golf course. It has been open for over 60 years. The  clubhouse incorporates the historic Frakes homestead of Samuel H. T. Frakes and Almeda Mudgett Frakes which was once a way station along the old stagecoach route. Others include the Lakes Women's Club, The Go for Fun Club, Lakes And Valleys Conservancy Group, Lakes & Valleys Art Guild, Fire Safe Council and the Lakes Baseball & Softball Teams.

Demographics

The 2010 United States Census reported that Lake Hughes had a population of 649. The racial makeup of Lake Hughes was 544 (83.8%) White (77.5% Non-Hispanic White), 19 (2.9%) African American, 7 (1.1%) Native American, 5 (0.8%) Asian, 1 (0.2%) Pacific Islander, 54 (8.3%) from other races, and 19 (2.9%) from two or more races. Hispanic or Latino of any race were 104 persons (16.0%).

The Census reported that 626 people (96.5% of the population) lived in households, 23 (3.5%) lived in non-institutionalized group quarters, and 0 (0%) were institutionalized.

There were 300 households, out of which 55 (18.3%) had children under the age of 18 living in them, 114 (38.0%) were opposite-sex married couples living together, 26 (8.7%) had a female householder with no husband present, 16 (5.3%) had a male householder with no wife present.  There were 23 (7.7%) unmarried opposite-sex partnerships, and 4 (1.3%) same-sex married couples or partnerships. 111 households (37.0%) were made up of individuals, and 26 (8.7%) had someone living alone who was 65 years of age or older. The average household size was 2.09.  There were 156 families (52.0% of all households); the average family size was 2.76.

The population was spread out, with 105 people (16.2%) under the age of 18, 53 people (8.2%) aged 18 to 24, 143 people (22.0%) aged 25 to 44, 273 people (42.1%) aged 45 to 64, and 75 people (11.6%) who were 65 years of age or older.  The median age was 46.9 years. For every 100 females, there were 104.1 males.  For every 100 females age 18 and over, there were 100.0 males.

The homeowner vacancy rate was 4.9%; the rental vacancy rate was 9.9%.  381 people (58.7% of the population) lived in owner-occupied housing units and 245 people (37.8%) lived in rental housing units.

According to the 2010 United States Census, Lake Hughes had a median household income of $53,281, with 29.0% of the population living below the federal poverty line.

Education

In 1869 the Los Angeles County Board of Supervisors designated Elizabeth Lake School District to serve the area. Its school was the only one between Los Angeles and Bakersfield. A wooden structure was built that lasted until it was replaced in the early 1930s by the adobe structure on the east side of Elizabeth Lake Road, a quarter mile north of Andrada Corner (intersection of San Francisquito and Elizabeth Lake Roads). The district's name was changed to Hughes-Elizabeth Lakes Union School District.

The Hughes-Elizabeth Lakes Union Elementary School District is a California Distinguished School and serves kindergarten through 8th grade students. Children from the communities of Lake Hughes, Elizabeth Lake and Green Valley, as well as parts of Leona Valley and Pine Canyon, make up the student population, which is 81% White, 11% Hispanic and 8% other ethnic groups. The district has an approximate enrollment of 330 students.

Notable residents
In the spring of 1947 Roy Rogers purchased a new retreat at Lake Hughes. He named his home the "Sky Haven Ranch" and it is still referred to as this today. Cheryl Rogers, the first Rogers child of school age, began 1st grade at Lake Hughes School. The school was a large one-room house "up the school road" (a dirt road) from the trading post, which consisted of the post office and a filling station.

See also

Hughes Lake (California)
Elizabeth Lake (Los Angeles County, California)
Elizabeth Lake, California — town
Angeles National Forest — surrounding Lake Hughes.
 – related topics

References

External links

Lakes Community Center
Hughes Elizabeth Lakes Union School

Unincorporated communities in Los Angeles County, California
Populated places in the Mojave Desert
Sierra Pelona Ridge
Angeles National Forest
Populated places established in 1873
1873 establishments in California
Unincorporated communities in California